Justin Wayne Jacobs (born  1981) is an American statistician, currently serving as the Senior Basketball Researcher with the Orlando Magic. Jacobs is a former applied research mathematician at the National Security Agency, and an independent sports analytics researcher. Noted for his research into geolocation, geospatial statistics and spatio-temporal statistics, Jacobs was awarded a National Intelligence Medallion from the ODNI in January 2014 by the Director of National Intelligence as well as the Presidential Early Career Award for Science and Engineering (PECASE) in April 2014 by President Barack Obama.

Life
Jacobs earned his Bachelor of Science (B.S.) degrees in mathematics and software engineering at Carroll University in Waukesha, Wisconsin in 2003; his Master of Science (M.S.) degree in mathematics at University of Wisconsin–Milwaukee in 2005, and his Ph.D. in statistics at University of Maryland Baltimore County in 2014. Jacobs is a former NCAA basketball player, is married and has two children.

Jacobs' M.S. research involved development of asymptotic confidence interval estimation for exponential distribution and Pareto distribution, with applications into insurance coverage for wind damage data. Jacobs' Ph.D. dissertation is in the field of statistics and differential geometry, titled "Nonparametric Bayesian Density Estimation on Riemannian Manifolds" and has applications in the fields of geolocation and geostatistics. Jacobs has also served in an advisory and support role for scientists who have been trying to recover the ill-fated MH370 Malaysian airlines crash in the South Indian Ocean.

Career and achievements
Jacobs currently serves as an applied research mathematician in the National Security Agency with a main focus on geolocation and spatio-temporal analysis on the WGS 84 manifold. Much of Jacobs' work has involved nonparametric statistics and analysis of electromagnetic wavefront propagation analysis for RF geolocation in the presence of degraded Geospatial Navigation Satellite System (GNSS) signals. This includes signature building using other RF methods, which has resulted in a patent, an ODNI medallion award, and the PECASE award.

Sports analytics
Jacobs also independently develops prediction models on data obtained from the National Collegiate Athletic Association NCAA and the National Basketball Association NBA. These methods range from score predictions of NCAA and NBA games based on several factors such as recent player performance, past positional match-ups and referee assignments to ranking algorithms based on win-loss models, player injuries, locations, and times of day. In his 2015 recent rankings algorithm, Jacobs' predicted 65 of 68 NCAA Division One Men's Basketball Teams that would make the field of 68 for the annual March Madness National Championship tournament. In contrast, Joe Lunardi of ESPN predicted 65 correct. In 2016, Jacobs' model correctly selected 65 of the 68 NCAA teams selected to the NCAA Tournament, again tying Lunardi. In 2017, Jacobs' model correctly selected all 68 of the 68 NCAA teams selected to the NCAA Tournament, this time beating the ESPN results that had 67 selected.

Jacobs maintains a website called Squared2020: Squared Statistics. Jacobs uses the site to break down basketball analytics and provide insight into advanced modeling techniques for spatial temporal data. In December 2017, Jacobs announced his signing to the Orlando Magic as a Senior Basketball Researcher.

References

1980s births
Living people
People from Stoughton, Wisconsin
Carroll University alumni
University of Wisconsin–Milwaukee alumni
American statisticians